Jarrod Halliday (born 10 February 1997) is a New Zealand rugby union player who plays for Counties Manukau in the National Provincial Championship. His playing position is First five-eighth, wing or fullback.

Reference list

External links
itsrugby.co.uk profile

1992 births
New Zealand rugby union players
Living people
Rugby union fly-halves
Rugby union wings
Rugby union fullbacks
Counties Manukau rugby union players